Pati (Sanskrit: पति, 𐬯𐬙) is a title meaning "master" or "lord". The word is in common usage in the Indian subcontinent today. Etymologically, the word derives from the Indo-European language family and finds references in various classical Indo-Iranian languages, including Sanskrit, Old Persian language and Avestan. In modern-day Hindustani and other Indian languages, pati and patni have taken on the meanings of husband and wife respectively when used as standalone words. The feminine equivalent in Indo-Aryan languages is patni (literally, "mistress" or "lady"). The term pati is frequently used as a suffix, e.g. lakhpati (meaning, master of a lakh rupees).

Modern usage
As a standalone term indicating husband, pati
In an official titles, e.g. Rashtra-pati (राष्ट्रपति, راشٹرپتی , National President), Sena-pati (सेनापति, سیناپتی , General of an Army,  Master of an Army)
In adjectives, e.g. crore-pati (करोड़पति, کروڑپتی, rich, master of a crore rupees), "lakh-pati" (लखपति, لکھپتی , rich person, master of a lakh Rupees). 
As a descriptive term, e.g. dampati (married couple, master and mistress of the house)
 In names and surnames. It has been in usage in names in the Indian subcontinent since ancient times.  Eg. Ganapati or Ganapathy (गणपति, Gana+Pati. Lord of the people/group/multitudes/categorical system); Bhupathy (Mahesh Bhupathy (भूपति, Bhu +Pati. Lord of the earth/soil)

Etymology and cognates
The term pati is believed to originate from the Proto-Indo-European language. Older Persian languages, such as Avestan, use the term pati or paiti as a title extensively, e.g. dmana-paiti (master of the house, similar to Sanskrit dam-pati).

In Sanskrit, it is 'pat-' when uncompounded and meaning"husband" instrumental case p/atyā-; dative case p/atye-; genitive case ablative p/atyur-; locative case p/atyau-; But when meaning"lord, master", and in fine compositi or 'at the end of a compound' regularly inflected with exceptions) a master, owner, possessor, lord, ruler, sovereign	  etc. For example, in the Vedas, we come across words such as  Brhas –pati, Praja – pati, Vachas –pati, Pasu – pati, Apam –pati, Bhu pati, Tridasa – pati and Nr - pati. Here the 'pati’'  is suffix translated as “Lord of …………..”

In several Indo-European languages, cognate terms exist in varying forms (often as a suffix), for instance in the English word "despot" from the Greek δεσ-πότης, meaning "master, despot, lord, owner." In Latin, the term changed meaning from master to able, and is "an example of a substantive coming to be used as an adjective," resulting in English words such as potent, potential and potentate. In Lithuanian, pats as a standalone word came to mean husband, himself (patis in Old Lithuanian), as did pati in Hindi/ Hindustani.

Common usage
Rashtrapati
Pashupati
Ganapati
Vāstoṣpati
Vacaspati
Brhaspati
Ksetrapati
Chhatrapati
Sethupathi
Crorepati

References

Titles in India
Suffixes
Hindustani language